Southern Okanagan Secondary (formerly Southern Okanagan High School) is a public high school in Oliver, British Columbia (part of School District 53 Okanagan Similkameen). On September 12, 2011, the majority of the school was engulfed in flames. The facility was under a multimillion-dollar renovation project at the time. Most of the original school was completely destroyed in the fire. The Frank Venables Auditorium was also destroyed in early morning fire. After investigation by the R.C.M.P. details were not publicly released, however, the cause is commonly believed to be arson. The Southern Okanagan Secondary School was a rare Streamline Moderne design, opening its doors in October 1948. The first principal was Mr. C. Ritchie. The BC government contributed $19.5 million to the rebuilding of the new school. Construction began Spring 2012. A grand opening for the new school was held on February 6, 2014, and showcased the new Frank Venables Theatre.

Gallery

High schools in British Columbia
Burned buildings and structures in Canada
Streamline Moderne architecture in Canada
Defunct schools in Canada
Schools in the Okanagan
Educational institutions established in 1948
1948 establishments in British Columbia